The 2017–18 Georgia State Panthers women's basketball team represented Georgia State University in the 2017–18 NCAA Division I women's basketball season. The Panthers, coached by Sharon Baldwin-Tener in her eighth season, were a member of the Sun Belt Conference, and played their home games on campus at the GSU Sports Arena. They finished season 8–22, 4–14 in Sun Belt play to finish in tenth place. They lost in the first round of the Sun Belt women's tournament to Coastal Carolina.

On March 14, head coach Sharon Baldwin's contract was not renewed. She finished an eight-year record at Georgia State of 88–152.

Roster

Schedule

|-
!colspan=9 style="background:#003399; color:#FFFFFF;"| Non-conference regular season

|-
!colspan=9 style="background:#003399; color:#FFFFFF;"| Sun Belt regular season

|-
!colspan=9 style="background:#003399; color:#FFFFFF;"| Sun Belt Women's Tournament

See also
 2017–18 Georgia State Panthers men's basketball team

References

Georgia State
Georgia State Panthers women's basketball seasons